Porto Velho-Governador Jorge Teixeira de Oliveira International Airport  also called Belmonte Airport referring to the neighborhood where it is located, is the airport serving Porto Velho, Brazil. Since 3 July 2002, the airport has been named after Jorge Teixeira de Oliveira (1922-1987), the first Governor of the State of Rondônia.

The airport is operated by Vinci SA.

Some of its facilities are shared with the Porto Velho Air Force Base of the Brazilian Air Force.

History
The airport was opened on 16 April 1969 as a replacement for Caiari Airport, which was then closed. The airport has been operated by Infraero since 1979 and in 2002 it was granted international status.

Previously operated by Infraero, on April 7, 2021 Vinci SA won a 30-year concession to operate the airport.

Airlines and destinations

Access

See also

List of airports in Brazil
Porto Velho Air Force Base

References

External links

Airports in Rondônia
Airports established in 1969
Porto Velho